Eugnosta mexicana is a species of moth of the  family Tortricidae. It is found in North America, where it has been recorded from Arizona, Colorado, New Mexico and Utah.

The wingspan is 17–20 mm. Adults have been recorded on wing from June to August.

References

Moths described in 1907
Eugnosta